Törst is the second studio album by Swedish rock artist Ulf Lundell. It was released in June 1976 on Harvest and EMI Svenska. It was recorded in EMI Studio, Stockholm and produced by Björn Boström. Törst has sold gold.

Track listing
All songs by Ulf Lundell, except where noted:
Side one
"Törst" - 6:33
"Jag vill ha ett lejon" - 4:26
"Mitt i nattens djungel ställd" - 5:07
"Birgitta hon dansar" - 5:26

Side two
"USA" - 4:06
"Och går en stund på jorden" - 3:28
"Cobra Rax" - 3:52
"Våren närmar sej city" - 4:26
"Söndag" - 4:06

Personnel
Ulf Lundell - vocals
Finn Sjöberg - guitar
Per-Erik Hallin - piano, orgel, clavinett, dragspelet Victoria Super
Mike Watson - bass, washboard
Erik Romantschicz - drums
Mats Glenngård - violin
Ulf Andersson - saxophone

Charts

References

1976 albums
Ulf Lundell albums